Dumbiedykes is a residential area in the centre of Edinburgh, Scotland. It mainly comprises  public housing developments.

It is bounded in the north by Holyrood Road, the west by the Pleasance and St Leonard's Street and the east by Holyrood Park.

Etymology

The site housed Edinburgh's Deaf and Dumb School until the mid 19th century. As the inhabitants of the school were known as the "dumbies", the local area became known as Dumbie Dykes or Dumbies Dykes.

History

Through the first part of the 20th. century, the area was composed of tenement buildings many of which did not have internal toilet facilities. By the 1960s many of these buildings had become dilapidated, and resultingly the buildings were demolished and the tenants moved to new estates in Craigmillar, The Inch, Liberton, Prestonfield, Restalrig, Burdiehouse, Gracemount, Gilmerton and other areas of Edinburgh. Ian Rankin called the rebuilt tenement area "Greenfield" in his novel Dead Souls (1999):

Despite the area benefiting from a superficial building regeneration including modern flats, student residences, University of Edinburgh sports facilities and being popular area to live in due to its closeness to the centre of Edinburgh and its immediate proximity to the  Scottish Parliament, when compared with other residential areas in central Edinburgh, it still remains an economically impoverished part of the city, suffering from the associated aspects of social problems such as disproportionately high levels of unemployment along with drug and alcohol abuse. In recent years there have also been several notable cases of suspected murders.

See also
Holyrood, Edinburgh

References

External links
 Bartholomew's Chronological map of Edinburgh (1919)

Dumbiedykes
Housing estates in Edinburgh